Harmony Centre (SC; , ЦC) was a social-democratic political alliance in Latvia. It originally consisted of five political parties: the National Harmony Party, the Socialist Party of Latvia, New Centre, the Daugavpils City Party, and the Social Democratic Party. Through a series of mergers they were eventually reduced to two: Social Democratic Party "Harmony" and the Socialist Party.

Ideologically a catch-all grouping of centre-left and left-wing parties, the alliance also aimed to represent the interests of Russians in Latvia.

History
Founded on 9 July 2005, Harmony Centre emerged from For Human Rights in a United Latvia, an electoral alliance formed by the National Harmony Party, the Socialist Party and Equal Rights, that partially dissolved in 2003. Equal Rights represented the interests of the Russian minority and the Russian language in Latvia. The National Harmony Party, New Centre and the Daugavpils City Party joined at foundation, the Socialist Party in December 2005 and the Social Democratic Party in January 2009. The alliance aimed to consolidate the Latvian centre-left and promote Latvian-Russian amity. The first chairman was the head of New Centre Sergey Dolgopolov who was replaced in Autumn 2005 by Channel One Russia Journalist Nils Ušakovs.

In 2010 and 2011 the National Harmony Party, New Centre, Social Democratic Party and Daugavpils City Party merged to form the Social Democratic Party "Harmony", which continued in alliance with the Socialist Party until 2014.

In its nine years of existence, Harmony Centre became the most popular political force in the Latvian Parliament but remained in opposition. Various positions on Latvia's National Question, citizenship law and close relations with United Russia, perceived by the centre-right as incompatible with Latvian national interests, led to the alliance being excluded from government. In 2014, Harmony and the Socialist Party participated separately in the European election of that year.

In the 2018 parliamentary election Harmony once again received the most votes, securing 23 out of 100 seats in the Latvian parliament, but was left outside the coalition.

Election results

Legislative elections

European Parliament elections

Political positions 
Social democracy, progressive income taxation, minority rights, participatory democracy, internationalisation of higher education, good relations with Russia. 
Economically, Harmony Centre supported increased social spending, in order to boost the economy and increase general welfare.

On the occupation of Latvia 

Both chairman of "Harmony Centre's" Parliamentary faction Jānis Urbanovičs and leader of the alliance Nils Ušakovs have rejected calling Soviet occupation of Latvia in 1940 an "occupation", arguing that from the perspective of international law it was an "annexation" instead, because Kārlis Ulmanis actively collaborated with Soviet representatives in Latvia, and compared recognizing occupation of Latvia to repressions against the society. However, they admitted that "If it had been clearly stated already at the very beginning that recognizing the fact would in no way harm people who immigrated during the Soviet times, Harmony Center would agree to recognize even ten such occupations."

Ušakovs has emphasized that "no doubt Latvia was forcibly annexed by the Soviet Union and it was followed by brutal Stalinist regime crimes against Latvia and its people", but also believed it's important to say that Soviet regime ended when the then-Russian Federation’s army left the country, claiming that otherwise, certain politic forces could bring up "de-occupation" again. Later Urbanovičs summarized similarly: "there were occupations in Latvia, there are no occupants". Both of them have also proposed to postpone the debate on national and historical issues and focus on the economic and social problems instead.

MP from Harmony Centre Boris Tsilevitch has pointed out that no official documents testify Harmony Centre recognizing the occupation. MEP from Harmony Centre and chairman of the Socialist Party of Latvia, one of the parties making up Harmony Centre, Alfrēds Rubiks has also declared that he has never recognized Latvia’s occupation and never will, because he believes the country was not occupied by the Soviet Union.

On the Ukrainian crisis 

Urbanovičs blamed the Revolution of Dignity on what he believed were the "West's efforts to sabotage Russian plans for a Eurasian Customs Union" and called the Annexation of Crimea by the Russian Federation "a desperate measure on the part of Russia in order to prevent economic and military imbalance in the contact zone of Southeastern Europe between NATO and Russia", citing the precedent of Abrene County as a partial justification.

Ušakovs has said he fully supports Ukrainian territorial integrity, "including Crimea", but did not want to analyze who was to blame for what happened in Ukraine and called for an international investigation. He also criticised EU sanctions against Russia as ineffective and damaging for the Latvian economy. On 4 March 2014, 28 Harmony Centre deputies voted against a resolution of the Saeima that strongly condemned Russia's military involvement and aggression in Ukraine.

References

External links 
 www.saskanascentrs.lv 

2005 establishments in Latvia
Defunct political party alliances in Latvia
Russian political parties in Latvia
Russian nationalist organizations
Social democratic parties in Latvia